Big Foot Prairie is an unincorporated community and census-designated place in McHenry County, Illinois, United States. It was named a CDP for the 2020 census, at which time it had a population of 65. It is located in Chemung Township. The community extends north into Walworth County, Wisconsin, where there is a CDP of the same name in the town of Walworth.

History
The community is named for Big Foot, a Potawatomi leader who resided on nearby Kishwauketoe (today Geneva Lake in Wisconsin) until his band was forcibly removed by the United States in 1836. It once had a post office, which opened on May 15, 1848.

Demographics

2020 census

References

Census-designated places in Illinois
Census-designated places in McHenry County, Illinois
Chicago metropolitan area
Populated places established in 1848
Majority-minority cities and towns in McHenry County, Illinois